, sometimes credited as Kouichi Ishii, is a video game designer perhaps best known for creating the Mana series (known as Seiken Densetsu in Japan). He joined Square (now Square Enix) in 1987, where he has directed or produced every game released in the Mana series (as of 2006). He has also contributed to several games in Square Enix's SaGa and Final Fantasy series, and created the well-known chocobo and moogle characters.

Biography

Square Co./Square Enix
Koichi Ishii worked on Final Fantasy I, II, and III, as well as SaGa Frontier. He was invited to work on the original Final Fantasy in 1986, and helped develop the crystal theme that became a recurring motif of the series. Ishii became the head of Square Enix's Product Development Division-8.

Mana series
He wanted to create a game called "Seiken Densetsu" in 1987, but Square rejected the idea before he even finished planning it. He was able to develop it in the early 1990s as a Final Fantasy Gaiden. He was involved in the development of the Sword of Mana and all other World of Mana games.

The World of Mana series was conceived to be a way for players to experience the Mana (series) in many formats and gameplay styles.

On Heroes of Mana, development of a real-time strategy game became so difficulty they had to start development all over at one point.
Another challenge of game development was due to the Japanese gaming audiences lack of familiarity with an RTS style of gaming. The world of Seiken Densetsu 3 was chosen due to its plot involving warring states, which was thought to be well suited for an RTS game.

He left Square Enix after the release of the World of Mana series. During the series' 30th anniversary stream was announced that a new console game of the series is in early stage of development, and that Ishii is involved with the project.

Final Fantasy XI
Ishii was also the original director for the MMORPG Final Fantasy XI and continued to be a central team member throughout the development of its first expansion, Rise of the Zilart. His guiding principle throughout the initial development cycle, according to a 2016 interview, was to both create compelling world and setting for the game as well as emphasize teamwork among players.

On the topic of creating the game's world, Vana'diel, he stated: "[FFXI is] a sandbox, I suppose. “There’s the toy, let’s dig holes and build castles,” players would think. Creating an atmosphere where that will bring satisfaction was the goal." To support this design pattern, he claims to have deliberately spent time adding small atmospheric touches such as rainbows, hidden areas only reachable through exploration, auroras, flowers, and other "spontaneous events" that would draw the player into the game world. Ishii describes these as being quite important despite his perception of others viewing them as "pointless events."

In a Famitsu interview, he was quite vocal about using game mechanics to attempt to sculpt player behavior toward cooperation and teamwork. Ishii claims credit (alongside Hiroshi Takai, credited as an assistant director of Final Fantasy XIV) for FFXI's skillchain system, by which players cooperate to time weapon skill abilities in concert to achieve bonus damage to an enemy monster. He explains that he created the system because he "thought it was important to create a sense of teamwork even while playing with strangers, and to that end [he] created the skillchain system." Two other areas he designed with teamwork in mind were the game economy and an EXP penalty upon death. The game economy was designed to make the player feel "insignificant" by emphasizing "production, consumption, and distribution," with the end goal of "understanding the importance of community." In a similar fashion, Ishii enforced an EXP penalty upon character death in FFXI because the player would "feel empathy for [his or her] teammates when they got knocked out."

Grezzo
He formed the new developer Grezzo in April 2007. Koichi developed the game Line Attack Heroes for Wii.

Style and reception
IGN called Ishii one of the top 100 best game creators ever. Ishii is noted for his use of an active real time battle system, a pioneering move at the time. Some critics felt that the constant switching between a battle screen and the world map made the games feel faster paced and "deeper". He was also praised for his use of cutting-edge technologies such as Mode 7 graphics to create a 3D feel.

Games

References

External links

1964 births
Final Fantasy designers
Mana (series)
Living people
Square Enix people